Tomas Platzer (born 1969) (sometimes shown as Thomas Platzer) is a German bobsledder and skeleton racer who competed in the late 1990s and early 2000s. He won a silver medal in the four-man event at the 2000 FIBT World Championships in Altenberg.

As of 2007, Platzer is a coach with the Russian bobsleigh and skeleton federation, a position he will stay at until 2008.

References
Bobsleigh four-man world championship medalists since 1930
Allsport.ru news on Platzer's coaching position through 2008
Skeletonsport.com profile

German male bobsledders
German male skeleton racers
Living people
1969 births
20th-century German people